Jenniffer Aydin González Colón (born August 5, 1976) is a Puerto Rican politician who serves as the 20th Resident Commissioner of Puerto Rico. González has served in leadership positions in the New Progressive Party of Puerto Rico (PNP) and in the Republican Party of the United States. These positions included being the chairwoman of the Puerto Rico Republican Party, speaker and minority leader of the House of Representatives of Puerto Rico, and vice-chair of the PNP. González is the youngest person to be Resident Commissioner and the first woman to hold the role.

Early life and education
González was born in San Juan to the late Jorge González and Nydia Colón. She graduated from University Gardens High School and then received a bachelor's degree in political science from the University of Puerto Rico's Río Piedras campus. During these years she served as the executive director of the Young Republican Federation of Puerto Rico.

She obtained both a Juris Doctor and an LL.M. from the Interamerican University of Puerto Rico School of Law.

Early political career

Representative
González was first elected to the House of Representatives of Puerto Rico in a special election held on February 24, 2002, to fill the vacancy left by former House Speaker Edison Misla Aldarondo, after his resignation as representative from San Juan's 4th District. She was the first female elected representative of San Juan's Fourth District, the youngest member of the 14th Legislative Assembly, and the youngest woman ever to be elected to the Puerto Rico Legislative Assembly. Before being elected as representative, González served as chairwoman of the San Juan New Progressive Party Youth Organization and was very active in the pro-statehood student movement while attending college.

González was re-elected in the 2004 Puerto Rico general elections, this time as an at-large representative. She served as chairwoman of the House Government Affairs Committee and as ranking member of the Budget, San Juan Development, Women's Affairs, and Internal Affairs Committees, as well as the Joint Commission for the Revision of the Civil Code of Puerto Rico.

Speaker of the House

González was re-elected to another term in the 2008 Puerto Rico general elections obtaining the most votes from her party, and the second most votes overall. At the age of 32, she was elected House Speaker by members of her New Progressive Party delegation during a caucus held on November 7, 2008. González defeated incumbent House Speaker José Aponte Hernández in his bid for re-election to that post, becoming the youngest person in Puerto Rican history to be elected Speaker of the House, and the third woman to hold that seat.

Chairwoman of the Republican Party of Puerto Rico

In November 2015, González was unanimously elected as chairwoman of the Republican Party of Puerto Rico after being the party's vice-chair for eight years. She succeeded Aguadilla mayor Carlos Méndez in the position that once was held by former governor Don Luis A. Ferré, founder of the New Progressive Party, and Dr. Jose Celso Barbosa the founder of both the Republican Party and the statehood movement in Puerto Rico.
During the 2020 Republican National Convention, she was unable to travel to the convention venue due to the fact that she was in self-quarantine after having tested positive to the novel coronavirus or COVID-19.  She delegated her role of delegation chair at the 2020 convention in Kevin Romero, who became the youngest delegation chair and roll call participant in 2020.

House Minority Leader

In 2012, González was again re-elected, this time gathering the most votes overall, despite the fact that her party lost the majority of seats. The same night of the election, she was selected to become minority leader of her party.

Resident Commissioner of Puerto Rico

Elections

2016 

On September 14, 2015, González announced her candidacy to succeed Pedro Pierluisi as Resident Commissioner of Puerto Rico. Six days later, one of Pierluisi's rivals for the gubernatorial nomination, Ricardo Rosselló, agreed with her to become running mates for the June 5, 2016, primary and the November 8, 2016, general election. During the ten months the primary race lasted, various public opinion polls consistently showed González to have over 70% approval ratings of the electorate, making her the most popular politician of any political party on the island.

On June 5, 2016, González won the NPP primary by a landslide margin of 70.54% of the vote over her opponent Carlos Pesquera. She thus became the first woman in the history of the New Progressive Party to be nominated to the Resident Commissioner seat in Congress.

On November 8, 2016, González was elected Resident Commissioner of Puerto Rico, with 48.77% of the vote, over her main opponent, the late Héctor Ferrer of the Popular Democratic Party of Puerto Rico, becoming the first woman and youngest person to represent Puerto Rico in the U.S. Congress since the creation of the Resident Commissioner of Puerto Rico seat 116 years prior in 1900.

So far in her time in Congress, González has focused on sponsoring or cosponsoring bills related to veterans affairs, health relief and tax relief for Puerto Rico. Congresswoman González is a member of the Republican Conference House Policy Committee. She is also a member of the House Committees on Natural Resources, Veterans’ Affairs, and Small Business, vice chair of the Subcommittee on Indian, Insular, and Alaska Native Affairs, member of Subcommittee on Oversight and Investigations and co-chair of the Congressional Friends of Spain Caucus.

During her first two years in Congress, Rep. González-Colón spent a great deal of time and effort on efforts related to hurricane recovery after Hurricanes Irma and María. This included participating in multiple House and Senate trips to Puerto Rico and joining the president on Air Force One during his 2017 official visit to view the hurricanes' damage to Puerto Rico.

For the 116th Congress, González has served in the Committee on Transportation and Infrastructure and the Committee on Natural Resources.  Since 2019, she has continued focusing on disaster recovery issues. Her focus on disaster recovery for the island first began after hurricanes Irma and Maria in 2017, but continued through 2020, after an earthquake on January 7, 2020, struck and caused significant damage to the south and southeastern regions of Puerto Rico.

2020

Committee assignments 
Committee on Natural Resources (Vice Ranking Member for Insular Affairs)
 Subcommittee on Indian, Insular, and Alaska Native Affairs
 Subcommittee on Oversight and Investigations
Committee on Small Business
 Subcommittee on Economic Growth, Tax and Capital Access
 Subcommittee on Health and Technology
Committee on Veterans’ Affairs
 Subcommittee on Health
 Subcommittee on Oversight and Investigation

Caucus memberships 

 Republican Main Street Partnership
 House Baltic Caucus
 Congressional Western Caucus
 Climate Solutions Caucus
 Congressional HIV/AIDS Caucus (co-chair)
 Republican Governance Group
Problem Solvers Caucus

Political positions
In The Hills article The Hill's Latina Leaders to Watch, Resident Commissioner González is described as a pro-statehood, small government, pro-business conservative. In the first session of the 115th United States Congress, González was ranked the 19th most bipartisan member of the House by the Bipartisan Index, a metric published by The Lugar Center and Georgetown's McCourt School of Public Policy to assess congressional bipartisanship.

In 2019, González was one of three House Republicans, along with Brian Fitzpatrick and John Katko, to co-sponsor the Equality Act, which prohibits discrimination on the basis of sexual orientation and gender identity. Although González could not vote for final passage of the bill due to U.S. House rules, the legislation passed the United States House of Representatives during the 116th Congress.

After the 2021 United States Capitol attack the commissioner condemned the violence and blamed President Donald Trump for inciting the riot. However, the commissioner still supported the majority of Republicans in their effort to remove Liz Cheney from her position as chair of House Republican Conference.

Personal life
On August 24, 2020, during the COVID-19 pandemic, González announced that she had tested positive for the virus.

See also

History of women in Puerto Rico
List of Puerto Ricans
List of Hispanic Americans in the United States Congress
Women in the United States House of Representatives

References

External links
 
 

|-

|-

|-

|-

|-

1976 births
21st-century American politicians
21st-century American women politicians
Female members of the United States House of Representatives
Living people
New Progressive Party members of the House of Representatives of Puerto Rico
Puerto Rican Roman Catholics
Republican Party (Puerto Rico) politicians
Republican Party members of the United States House of Representatives from Puerto Rico
Resident Commissioners of Puerto Rico
Speakers of the House of Representatives of Puerto Rico
University of Puerto Rico alumni
Puerto Rican women in politics